Patricio Federico Gregorio Altamiranda (born 28 February 1999) is a Uruguayan professional footballer who plays as a midfielder forNacional.

Career
A youth academy graduate of Danubio, Gregorio made his professional debut on 30 May 2018 in a 4–1 league win against Rampla Juniors.

Career statistics

Club

References

External links
 

1999 births
Living people
Footballers from Montevideo
Association football midfielders
Uruguayan footballers
Uruguayan Primera División players
Uruguayan Segunda División players
Danubio F.C. players
Villa Española players
Club Nacional de Football players
Club Atlético River Plate (Montevideo) players
Racing Club de Montevideo players